Mount Everest, at  is currently the world's highest mountain and is a particularly desirable peak for mountaineers. This is a list of people who reached the summit of Mount Everest in the 20th century. Overall about 1,383 people summited Everest between 1953 and the end of 2000. After 2000, the number of summiters greatly increased when ascending the mountain became more accessible and more popular. By 2013, 6,871 summits had been recorded by 4,042 different people.

1950s
Only six people summited Mount Everest in the 1950s:
 Sir Edmund Hillary and Tenzing Norgay on May 29, 1953 (1953 British Mount Everest expedition)
 Ernst Schmied and Jürg Marmet on May 23, 1956
 Dolf Reist and Hans-Rudolf von Gunten on May 24, 1956

1960s
In total, 18 people summited in the 1960s. These are some of the ascents:
Wang Fuzhou, Gonpo Dorje, and Chu Ying-hua on May 25, 1960. The 1960 Chinese Mount Everest expedition was the first to successfully climb Mount Everest by the North Ridge.
Jim Whittaker and Nawang Gombu on May 1, 1963
Barry Bishop, Lute Jerstad, Willi Unsoeld and Tom Hornbein on May 22, 1963
Nawang Gombu and 8 others Indian Everest Expedition 1965 on May 20, 1965
Avtar Singh Cheema
Sonam Gyatso
Sonam Wangyal
C. P. Vohra
Ang Kami
H. P. S. Ahluwalia
H. C. S. Rawat
Phu Dorjee Sherpa

1970s
In total, 78 people summited in the 1970s. These are some of the most notable ascents:
Four summited via South Col on the Saburo Matsukata 1970 expedition:
Teruo Matsuura
Naomi Uemura
Katsutoshi Hirabayashi
Chottare Sherpa
Junko Tabei and Sherpa Ang Tshering I on May 16, 1975
Phanthog on May 27, 1975
Doug Scott and Dougal Haston on September 24, 1975 (1975 British Mount Everest Southwest Face expedition)
Peter Boardman and Sirdar Pertemba Sherpa on September 26, 1975
Brummie Stokes and Bronco Lane on May 16, 1976 (1976 British Army expedition)
Ko Sang-don and Pemba Norbu Sherpa on Sept 15, 1977
Reinhold Messner  and Peter Habeler on 8 May 1978 (first ascent of Everest without supplementary oxygen)
Austrian Franz Oppurg summited solo in 1978
Sixteen people summited in October 1978 as part of the Franco-Deutsch expedition led by Dr. Karl Herrligkoffer:
Hubert Hillmaier
Sepp Mack (without supplementary oxygen)
Hans Engl
Pierre Mazeaud
Nicolas Jaeger
Kurt Diemberger
Jean Afanassief
Wanda Rutkiewicz
Robert Allenbach
Siegfried Hupfauer
Wilhelm Klimek
Ang Dorje (without supplementary oxygen)
Mingma Sherpa (without supplementary oxygen)
Ang Kami
George Ritter
Berndt Kullmann

Sungdare Sherpa on 2 October 1979
Andrej Štremfelj and Nejc Zaplotnik on May 13, 1979
Stipe Božić, Stane Belak and Sherpa Ang Phu on May 15, 1979

1980s
In the 1980s, 871 climbers set off from Base Camp; around 180 made the summit; and 56 died. Overall about 356 people summited Everest between 1953 and the end of 1989. These are some of the most notable ascents of the 1980s:
Leszek Cichy and Krzysztof Wielicki on February 17, 1980 (first winter ascent)
Takashi Ozaki and Tsuneo Shigehiro on May 10, 1980
 Martin Zabaleta and Pasang Temba on May 14, 1980
Jerzy Kukuczka and Andrzej Czok on May 19, 1980
 Reinhold Messner on August 20, 1980 (first solo ascent)
 Yasuo Kato
 Eleven Soviet climbers in 1982
 1982 Canadian Mount Everest Expedition
Laurie Skreslet on October 5, 1982, with Sherpas Sungdare Sherpa and Lhakpa Dorje
Pat Morrow on October 7, 1982, with Sherpas Pema Dorje and Lhakpa Tshering
Yasuo Kato and c Toshiaki Kobayashi
 Lou Reichardt, Kim Momb, and Carlos Buhler on October 8, 1983
 Dan Reid, George Lowe and Jay Cassell on October 9, 1983
Takashi Ozaki in December 1983
Hristo Prodanov on April 20, 1984
 Metodi Savov and Ivan Valchev on May 8, 1984
Nikolay Petkov and Kiril Doskov on May 9, 1984
 Bachendri Pal on May 23, 1984
 Tim Macartney-Snape and Greg Mortimer on October 3, 1984
 Phil Ershle on October 2, 1984
 Zoltán Demján, Jozef Psotka and Sherpa Ang Rita on October 15, 1984
1985 Norwegian Expedition led by Arne Naess, in April 1985
Chris Bonington
Ang Lhakpa Dorje Sherpa 
Dawa Nuru Sherpa  	
Arne Naess (Arne Næss)
Havard Nesheim 
Sungdare Sherpa 
Stein Aasheim 
Ralph Hoibakk 
Ang Rita Sherpa 
Pema Dorje Sherpa 
Chhewang Rinzi Sherpa 
David Breashears 
Richard Bass  	
Ang Phurba Sherpa 
1985 Catalan Expedition: Òscar Cadiach, Antoni Sors and Carles Vallès with Shambu Tamang, Ang Karma and Narayan Shrestha on August 28, 1985
 Erhard Loretan and Jean Troillet in 1986
 Sharon Wood and Dwayne Congdon on May 20, 1986
 Jean-Marc Boivin's 11-12 minute,  descent to Camp II holds the altitude record for start of a paraglider flight
 Marc Batard in 1988
 A joint team from China, Japan, and Nepal on May 5, 1988
 Stephen Venables on May 12, 1988
 Stacy Allison on September 29, 1988
 Lydia Bradey on 16 October 1988
 Sungdare Sherpa on 10 May 1988
 Stipe Bozic, Viki Groselj, Dimitar Ilievski-Murato, and Sherpas Sonam and Agiva on May 10, 1989
 Ricardo Torres-Nava and Sherpas, Ang Lhakpa and Dorje on May 16, 1989
 Carlos Carsolio on July 18, 1989

1990s
In the 1990s, 3,017 people set off from Base Camp(s); around 900 reached the summit; 55 died. Overall about 1237 people summited Everest between 1953 and the end of 1999. These are some of the most notable ascents in the 1990s:
International Peace Climb 1990 summiters in May 1990, led by Jim Whittaker:
Robert Link
Steve Gall
Sergei Arsentiev 
Grigori Lunyakov
Da Cheme 
Gyal Bu
Ed Viesturs
Mistislav Gorbenko
Andrej Tselishchev
Ian Wade
Luo Tse
Da Qiong
Ren Na (aka Rena)
Gui Sang
Ekaterina Ivanova
Anatoli Moshnikov
Yervand Ilyinski
Aleksandr Tokarev
Mark Tucker
Wang Ja
Warren Thompson
 Hooman Aprin on October 5, 1990
 Marc Batard on October 5, 1990
 Marija and Andrej Štremfelj on October 7, 1990
 Peter Hillary, Gary Ball and Rob Hall in 1990
 Tim Macartney-Snape in 1990
Kanhaya Lal Pokhriyal in 1992
Alberto Iñurrategi on 25.09.1992
 Rodrigo Jordan team in 1992
 Mauricio Purto team in 1992
 Cristian Garcia-Huidobro at 10:25 on May 15, 1992
 Doron Erel in 1992
 Santosh Yadav in May 1992
 Mohan Singh Gunjyal on 12 May 1992
Kushang Sherpa on May 10, 1993
Santosh Yadav and Dicky Dolma in May 1993 
 Veikka Gustafsson in spring 1993
 Pasang Lhamu Sherpa on April 22, 1993
9 people lead by Steve Bell October 7, 1993
 Steve Bell on October 7, 1993
 Graham Hoyland on October 7, 1993
 Ginette Harrison on October 7, 1993
 Gary Pfisterer on October 7, 1993
 Scott McIvor on October 7, 1993
 Ramón Blanco on October 7, 1993
 Santosh Yadav on May 10, 1993
 Park Young-seok on May 16, 1993
 Ninety commercial alpinists in the spring of 1993
 Alison Hargreaves   May 13, 1995
 Jim Litch on May 14, 1995
 Dan Aguilar on May 14, 1995
 Wongchu Sherpa on May 14, 1995
 Apa Sherpa on May 15, 1995 
 Brad Bull on May 15, 1995
 Tommy Heinrich on May 15, 1995 
 Caradog Jones on May 23, 1995
 Pat Falvey on 27 May 1995
 Kiyoshi Furuno and Shigeki Imoto in 1995
 1996 Mount Everest disaster
 Rob Hall (with Adventure Consultants)
 Scott Fischer (with Mountain Madness)
 Doug Hansen
 Makalu Gau
 Lene Gammelgaard
 Yasuko Namba
 Göran Kropp   May 1996, without extra bottle oxygen
 Ang Rita, May 23, 1996, tenth and last time to summit Mount Everest.
 David Breashears team including Jamling Tenzing Norgay Ed Viesturs Araceli Segarra (see also the 1998 film Everest)
 Sherpa Ang Rita summited ten times between 7 May 1983 and 23 May 1996
 Hans Kammerlander 1996
Kushang Sherpa on May 17, 1996

 Francys and Sergei Arsentiev on May 24, 1998
Bear Grylls, Neil Laughton and Alan Silva on May 26, 1998
 Tom Whittaker on May 27, 1998
Kushang Sherpa on May 28, 1998
 Kazi Sherpa (aka Kaji Sherpa) on October 17, 1998
Kushang Sherpa on May 28, 1999, until date summited from three sides of Mount Everest
 Sherpa Babu Chiri Sherpa in 1999
 Phurba Tashi Sherpa
 Cathy O'Dowd in 1999
 Elsa Ávila on May 5, 1999
Renata Chlumska on May 5, 1999
 Ken Noguchi on May 13, 1999
 Iván Vallejo on May 25, 1999
 [i], Merab Khabazi, and Irakli Ugulava on May 26, 1999
 Lev Sarkisov on May 12, 1999
 Karla S Wheelock on May 27, 1999
 João Garcia, on May 18, 1999
Fabiano Segatto,on May 18,1999 at 12:23pm
Everestsummiteersassociation.org/
 Willie Benegas in 1999
 George Dijmarescu on May 26, 1999

2000
In total, 146 people summited in 2000. Overall about 1383 people summited Everest between 1953 and the end of 2000. These are some of the most notable ascents in 2000:
Lhakpa Sherpa 2000
 Nazir Sabir on May 17, 2000
 Frits Vrijlandt on May 17, 2000
 Toshio Yamamoto, summited at age 63
 Babu Chiri Sherpa on May 21, 2000
 Anna Czerwińska on May 22, 2000
October 7, 2000 summiters included:
Davo Karničar (Davorin) on October 7, 2000
Franc Oderlap
Oliver Scoubes
Ang Dorje
Pasang Tenzing
On October 9, 2000 a group of three Slovenian climbers were the last of the year and this century to summit
Tadej Golob
Matej Flis
Grega Lačen

See also
List of Mount Everest records
List of Mount Everest summiters by number of times to the summit
List of Mount Everest expeditions
List of people who died climbing Mount Everest

References

External links
EverestHistory.com Summits by year, until 2004
Count of Mount Everest summiteers until the end of 2001

+
Everest Summitters